Theodore Jonas Flicker (June 6, 1930 – September 12, 2014) was an American playwright, theatrical producer, television and film director, actor, television writer, screenwriter, author and sculptor.

Early life
 
Born in 1930 at Freehold Borough, New Jersey, Flicker attended Admiral Farragut Academy in Tom's River, New Jersey from 1947 to 1949. From 1949 to 1951, he studied at Royal Academy of Dramatic Art in London, alongside fellow drama students Joan Collins and Larry Hagman.

Theatre career
In 1954, he became a member of Chicago's Compass Theater, America's first theater of improvisational comedy. Eventually, he worked as producer, director, and performer with the Compass Players in St. Louis. The company was such a success that he was able to raise money to establish the Crystal Palace Theater, then the only monthly repertory stage in the country.

In 1959, he wrote the book and directed the Broadway musical The Nervous Set. Fran Landesman provided the lyrics, and Tommy Wolf the musical score. The show was revived in 2006. In 1960, he established The Premise on New York's Bleecker Street in a basement venue, where he initially appeared alongside Tom Aldredge, George Segal, and Joan Darling. Over the next few years, openings would be filled by performers such as James Frawley, Buck Henry, Gene Hackman, Sandy Baron, Al Mancini, Garry Goodrow, George Furth, Cynthia Harris, Peter Bonerz, Mina Kolb, Michael Howard, and Sandra Seacat (as Sandra Kaufman). The show eventually transferred to the Comedy Theatre in London's West End.  A follow-up improvisational satire, The Premise in Living Color, targeted racism and featured Godfrey Cambridge, Diana Sands, and Al Freeman Jr.

Film and television career
Moving into motion pictures, Flicker directed and co-wrote (with Henry) the screenplay for his first film The Troublemaker in 1964. As a filmmaker, he is probably best known for his political lampoon The President's Analyst (1967) with James Coburn, although he cites Jacob Two-Two Meets the Hooded Fang (1978) among his personal favorites.

An occasional actor, he is the first victim in Beware! The Blob! (1972), directed by Larry Hagman. He also rides at full gallop as Buffalo Bill Cody in The Legend of the Lone Ranger (1981), debut-directed by cinematographer William A Fraker, who shot The President's Analyst.

As the writer of the pilot for the television series Barney Miller (1975), he became the show's co-owner, and also wrote and/or directed episodes of The Dick Van Dyke Show, The Andy Griffith Show, The Man From U.N.C.L.E., Night Gallery, The Streets of San Francisco, and I Dream of Jeannie. Flicker also appeared as the Devil in a 1971 episode of Night Gallery he had written called Hell's Bells.

Other ventures
Flicker has written extensively on expressionism and how it applies to his own art, and is the author of the epic novel The Good American, one of the first books to be marketed exclusively on the Internet.

A documentary biopic screened in 2007 at the Santa Fe Film Festival. Directed by David Ewing, Ted Flicker: A Life in Three Acts had its world premiere at Santa Fe's Film Center on October 17, 2008. Among the interviewees are George Segal and Tom Aldredge, as well as Henry and Darling.

Personal life
His only marriage was to Barbara Joyce Perkins, whom he wed in a Los Angeles synagogue on September 30, 1966. The couple resided in Santa Fe, New Mexico from 1986. Their northside home abuts a  sculpture garden displaying his own works as well as those of Allan Houser, Paul Moore, Tony Price, Michael Bergt, and others.

On May 13, 1994, Flicker legally changed his name to Ted Flicker.

Flicker died in his home in Santa Fe, New Mexico on the night of September 12, 2014. He was 84.

Filmography
The Troublemaker (with Buck Henry) (1964)
Many Happy Returns (1964) (TV)
The Man from U.N.C.L.E. (1964) (TV)
The Bill Dana Show (1964) (TV)
The Rogues (1965) (TV)
The Andy Griffith Show (1965) (TV)
The Dick Van Dyke Show (1965) (TV)
I Dream of Jeannie (1965) (TV)
Spinout (1966)
The President's Analyst (1967)
Up in the Cellar (1970)
Nichols (1971) (TV)
Night Gallery (1971) (TV)
Banyon (1972) (TV)
The Mod Squad (1972) (TV)
Streets of San Francisco (1972) (TV)
Guess Who's Sleeping in My Bed? (1973) (TV)
Banacek (1973) (TV)
Barney Miller (1974–1980) (TV)
Just a Little Inconvenience (1977) (TV)
Last of the Good Guys (1978) (TV)
Jacob Two-Two Meets The Hooded Fang (1978)
Where the Ladies Go (1980) (TV)
Soggy Bottom, U.S.A. (1981)

References

External links
Kliph Nesteroff Interview with Ted Flicker, 2014 

1930 births
2014 deaths
Admiral Farragut Academy alumni
Alumni of RADA
American male film actors
American male screenwriters
American male television actors
American television directors
American theatre managers and producers
American sculptors
Jewish American dramatists and playwrights
Jewish American male actors
Jewish sculptors
People from Freehold Borough, New Jersey
Film directors from Florida
American male dramatists and playwrights
20th-century American dramatists and playwrights
20th-century American male writers
Film directors from New Jersey
Screenwriters from New Jersey
21st-century American Jews